Stevenson is an unincorporated community located in the Green Spring Valley in Baltimore County, Maryland, United States. From 1830 until 1955, this community was served by the Green Spring Valley Branch of the old Northern Central Railway (later part of the Pennsylvania Railroad).

Primarily a residential area, it is the site of the main campus of Stevenson University (formerly Villa Julie College), which also has a campus in Owings Mills. It is also home to St. Timothy's School, an all-girls boarding and day high school. Fort Garrison was listed on the National Register of Historic Places in 1971.

References

External links

Brooklandville House (The Valley Inn) (Historic restaurant and tavern. Built c. 1832)
The Cloisters (Cloisters Castle) (Historic home and rental facility. Built c. 1930)
Gramercy Mansion. (Historic home and event facility.  Built c. 1902)

 
Unincorporated communities in Maryland
Unincorporated communities in Baltimore County, Maryland